Bai Shouyi (February 1909 – March 21, 2000), also known as Djamal al-Din Bai Shouyi, was a Chinese ethnologist, historian, social activist, and writer who revolutionized recent Chinese historiography and pioneered in relying heavily on scientific excavations and reports. A Marxist philosophically, his studies thus take a very class-centric view and reasoning.
Born a son of a Hui merchant in Kaifeng, he became literate in Arabic from his mother and aunt.

Bai argued for the need for increased awareness of Islam and Muslims by the Chinese population in general in 1937, since Muslims numbered 50 million in China alone and western works were the only works available for non-Muslim Chinese to study Muslims living right with them in China. He said Muslims in Western China could either stand as a "defensive wall" or "hinder ...national defence", depending on whether conduct to them was good or bad.

He died in Beijing at the age of 91.

See also
Chinese history

References
Bai Shouyi et al. (2003). A History of Chinese Muslim. Beijing: Zhonghua Book Company. . Cover page.

1909 births
2000 deaths
20th-century Chinese historians
Chinese ethnographers
Chinese Muslims
Historians from Henan
Hui people
People's Republic of China historians
Republic of China historians
Writers from Kaifeng